Eugen Apjok (born April 15, 1972) is a former Romanian rugby union player and a current coach being at the healm of Baia Mare. He played as a fly-half. In 2016 he was voted the best rugby head coach in Romania.

Club career
He  mostly played for Baia Mare, from the early nineties.

International career
Apjok gathered 3 caps for Romania, from his debut in 1996 to his last game in 2001. He scored 1 try and 6 conversions during his international career, 17 points on aggregate. He was a member as an assistant coach of his national side for the 8th Rugby World Cup in 2015.

References

External links

1972 births
Living people
Romanian rugby union players
Rugby union fly-halves
Romania international rugby union players
CSM Știința Baia Mare players
People from Baia Mare